The 1982–83 Morehead State Eagles men's basketball team represented Morehead State University during the 1982–83 NCAA Division I men's basketball season. The Eagles, led by head coach Wayne Martin, played their home games at Ellis Johnson Arena and are members of the Ohio Valley Conference. They finished the season 19–11, 10–4 in Ohio Valley play and were champions of the 1983 Ohio Valley Conference men's basketball tournament to earn an automatic bid in the NCAA tournament. As an 11 seed, they fell to No. 6 seed Syracuse in the first round.

Roster

Schedule and results
 
|-
!colspan=9 style=| Regular season

|-
!colspan=9 style=| Ohio Valley Conference Basketball tournament

|-
!colspan=9 style=| NCAA tournament

References

Morehead State
Morehead State
Morehead State Eagles men's basketball seasons
Morehead State Eagles men's basketball, 1982-83
Morehead State Eagles men's basketball, 1982-83